The siege of Fort Zeelandia of 1661–1662 ended the Dutch East India Company's rule over Taiwan and began the Kingdom of Tungning's rule over the island.

Prelude

From 1623 to 1624, the Dutch had been at war with Ming China over the Pescadores. In 1633 they clashed with a fleet led by Zheng Zhilong in the Battle of Liaoluo Bay, ending in Dutch defeat. The Dutch fortifications consisted of two forts along the bay: the first and foremost fortification was the multiple-walled Fort Zeelandia, situated at the entrance to the bay, while the second was the smaller Fort Provintia, a walled administrative office. Frederick Coyett, the governor of Taiwan for the Dutch East India Company, was stationed in Fort Zeelandia with 1,733 people: 905 soldiers and officers, 547 enslaved people, 218 women and children, and 63 married men, while his subordinate, Valentyn, was in charge of Fort Provintia and its garrison of 140 soldiers.

In 1659, after an unsuccessful attempt to capture Nanjing, Koxinga, son of Zheng Zhilong and leader of the Ming loyalist remnants, felt that the Qing Empire had consolidated their position in China sufficiently, while his troops needed more supplies and soldiers. He began searching for a suitable location as his base of operations, and soon a Chinese man named , who was working for the Dutch East India Company in Formosa (Taiwan), fled to Koxinga's base in Xiamen and provided him with a map of Taiwan.

Koxinga's invasion

Landing
On 23 March 1661, Koxinga's fleet set sail from Kinmen (Quemoy) with hundreds of junks of various sizes, with roughly 25,000 soldiers and sailors aboard. They arrived at Penghu the next day. On 30 March, a small garrison was left at Penghu while the main body of the fleet left and arrived at Tayoan on 2 April 2. On Baxemboy Island in the Bay of Taiwan, unrelated to the siege, 2,000 Chinese attacked 240 Dutch musketeers, routing them. Three Dutch ships attacked the Chinese junks and destroyed several until their main warship, the Hector, exploded due to a cannon firing near its gunpowder supply. The remaining two ships consisted of a yacht and a lesser warship, which could not keep Koxinga from controlling the waters around Taiwan. No further opposition was for the time encountered. The remainder of Koxinga's men safely landed and built earthworks overlooking the plain.

Siege

On April 4, Valentyn surrendered to Koxinga's army after it laid siege to Fort Provintia. The rapid assault had caught Valentyn unprepared since he was under the impression that the fort was under the protection of Fort Zeelandia. On April 7, Koxinga's army surrounded Fort Zeelandia, sending the captured Dutch priest Antonius Hambroek as an emissary, demanding the garrison's surrender. However, Hambroek urged the garrison to resist instead of surrender and was executed after returning to Koxinga's camp. Koxinga ordered his artillery to advance and used 28 cannons to bombard the fort.

Koxinga was confident in his army's ability to overwhelm the fort. They outnumbered the defenders twenty to one and he had hundreds of cannons. After careful planning and multiple feints, Koxinga bombarded the fort during the night, demolishing the roof of the Dutch governor's house. While initially unable to respond, the Dutch were able to reposition their guns and return fire from different angles using the bastion forts as vantage points. The assault was driven back with hundreds of Koxinga's best soldiers killed. The Dutch governor wrote that the enemy's cannons were badly placed, unprotected, and easy to destroy. The assault had caused no damage other than damaging a few houses and lightly wounding one Dutch artillerist. Shocked at the defeat, Koxinga abandoned the approach of taking the fortress by storm in favor of starving it out.

On the 28th of May, news of the siege reached Jakarta, and the Dutch East India Company dispatched a fleet of 12 ships and 700 sailors to relieve the fort. The first time they tried to land, they were forced away by bad weather, and one ship's crew was captured by the natives when it crashed into the beach. The natives killed most of the crew and sent them to Koxinga. On July 5, the relief force arrived and engaged in small-scale confrontations with Koxinga's fleet. On July 23, the two sides gave major battle as the Dutch fleet attempted to break Koxinga's blockade. A second, ultimately unsuccessful attempt at relief was mounted in October. The Dutch tried to bombard the Chinese position with their ships, but their shots were too high and missed their target, giving the Chinese gunners time to prepare and return fire. Meanwhile, the smaller Dutch ships engaged the Chinese junks, which lured them into a narrow strait with a false withdrawal. The Dutch ships were unable to get away as the wind had died, and they were forced to paddle their boats, but the Chinese caught them and massacred the crew on board, and used pikes to kill those who jumped overboard. The Chinese caught Dutch grenades in nets and threw them back at the Dutch. The Dutch flagship Koukercken ran aground right in front of an enemy cannon placement and was sunk. Another ship was stranded and its crew fled to Fort Zeelandia. The remaining Dutch fleet was forced to retreat with the loss of two ships, three smaller vessels, and 130 casualties.

Coyet remarked on the accuracy of Chinese cannon bombardment against Dutch gun emplacements on the fort, which rendered them immobile. Explosive landmines were used by Koxinga against Dutch musketeers.

In October, several dozen Dutch troops raided a nearby island for provisions. The raid took a disastrous turn when they encountered a small group of Chinese soldiers. They tried to flee, but suffered heavy casualties, losing 36 men.

In December, deserting German mercenaries brought Koxinga word of low morale among the garrison, and he launched a major assault on the fort, which was ultimately repelled. In January 1662, a German sergeant named Hans Jurgen Radis defected to give Koxinga critical advice on how to capture the fortress from a redoubt whose strategic importance had gone hitherto unnoticed by the Chinese forces. Koxinga followed his advice and the Dutch redoubt fell within a day. This claim of a defector appears in a post hoc account of the siege written by Frederick Coyett, whom scholars have noted sought to absolve the author of responsibility for the defeat. A Swiss soldier also writes about the betrayal independently. Ming records make no mention of any defector or German named Hans Jurgen Radis. The Ming dynasty had in the past dispatched work crews to salvage cannons from European shipwrecks and reverse engineer them.

On 12 January 1662, Koxinga's fleet initiated another bombardment, while the ground forces prepared to assault the fort. With supplies dwindling and no sign of reinforcement, Coyett finally ordered the hoisting of the white flag and negotiated terms of surrender, a process that was finalized on February 1. On the 9th of February, the remaining Dutch East India Company personnel left Taiwan; all were allowed to take with them their personal belongings, as well as provisions sufficient for them to reach the nearest Dutch settlement.

Torture
Both sides used torture in the war. One Dutch physician carried out a vivisection on a Chinese prisoner. The Chinese amputated the genitals, noses, ears, and limbs of Dutch prisoners while they were still alive and sent back the mutilated corpses and prisoners to the Dutch. Chinese rebels had earlier cut the genitals, eyes, ears, and noses of Dutch people in the Guo Huaiyi rebellion. The mouths of Dutch soldiers were filled with their amputated genitals by the Chinese who also slammed nails into their bodies, and amputated their noses, legs, and arms and sent the bodies of these Dutch soldiers back to the fort.

Taiwanese indigenous peoples

The Taiwanese indigenous peoples attacked both the Chinese and the Dutch. In the Kingdom of Middag, the natives welcomed warmly the troops led by Koxinga's commander, Chen Ze. When Chen Ze's troops had been lulled into a false sense of security, the natives killed them in their sleep, wiping out 1,500 of Koxinga's army. This was the worst of several native attacks on the Chinese. The second worst case occurred in the south, where another 700 of Koxinga's forces were wiped out by the natives. The natives who were previously allied with the Dutch against the Chinese during the Guo Huaiyi Rebellion in 1652 turned against the Dutch during the siege. The aboriginals (Formosans) of Sincan defected to Koxinga after he offered them amnesty. They proceeded to work for the Chinese in executing captured Dutchmen. On 17 May 1661, the frontier aboriginals in the mountains and plains also surrendered and defected to the Chinese. They celebrated their freedom from compulsory education under Dutch rule by hunting down Dutch colonists and beheading them, while destroying their Christian school textbooks. Koxinga formulated a plan to give oxen, farming tools, and teach farming techniques to the Taiwan Aboriginals. He gave them Ming gowns and caps, provided feasts for chieftains, and gifted tobacco to Aboriginals who were gathered in crowds to meet and welcome him as he visited their villages after he defeated the Dutch.

Aftermath

Dutch prisoners

During the siege of Fort Zeelandia, the Chinese took many Dutch prisoners, among them the Dutch missionary Antonius Hambroek and his wife, and two of their daughters. Koxinga sent Hambroek to Fort Zeelandia to persuade the garrison to surrender; if unsuccessful, Hambroek would be killed upon return. Hambroek went up to the Fort, where two of his other daughters still remained, and urged the garrison not to surrender. He subsequently returned to Koxinga's camp and was beheaded. Additionally, a rumor was spread among the Chinese that the Dutch were encouraging the native Taiwan aboriginals to kill the Chinese. In retaliation, Koxinga ordered the mass execution of Dutch male prisoners, mostly by crucifixion and decapitation with a few women and children also being killed. The remainder of the Dutch women and children were enslaved, with Koxinga taking Hambroek's teenage daughter as his concubine (she was described by the Dutch commander Caeuw as "a very sweet and pleasing maiden", while other Dutch women were sold to Chinese soldiers to become their (secondary) wives or mistresses. The daily journal of the Dutch fort recorded that "the best were preserved for the use of the commanders, and the rest were sold to the common soldiers. Happy was she that fell to the lot of an unmarried man, being thereby freed from vexations by the Chinese women, who are very jealous of their husbands." The Chinese took Dutch women as enslaved concubines and wives and they were never freed: in 1684, some were reported to be still living. In Quemoy, a Dutch merchant was contacted with an arrangement to release the prisoners, which a son of Koxinga's proposed, but it came to nothing.

The Chinese taking Dutch women as concubines was featured in Joannes Nomsz's famous play "Antonius Hambroek, of de Belegering van Formoza" ("Antonius Hambroek, or the Siege of Formosa"), which documented European anxieties at the fate of the Dutch women and defeat by non-Europeans.

Later Ming-Dutch encounters
In 1663, The Dutch allied with the Qing dynasty against the Zheng forces. In 1663, 15 Dutch ships scattered a Zheng fleet of several hundred junks.

The Dutch looted relics and killed monks after attacking a Buddhist complex at Putuoshan on the Zhoushan islands in 1665 during their war against Koxinga's son Zheng Jing.

In 1666, Chinese forces made an attempt to conquer another Dutch fort in Taiwan, defended by 300 Dutch soldiers with a force of 3,000 Chinese troops. The fort had been built to ensure Dutch influence on the island after Zeelandia's fall. It was equipped with four large bastions overlooking a flat field but lacked supplies and ammunition. The garrison itself was sickly and poorly equipped. The Chinese tried to take a redoubt on a small mountain near the fortress but were repelled by a small contingent of Dutch soldiers. They then built a small fort on a foothill below the mountain and set up four cannons to shoot at the Dutch fortress. After 109 shots, one Dutchman had been killed, but nearly all the shots were missed and did no damage to the walls. Nine days after arriving, the Chinese forces left. The garrison's commander, Joan de Meijer, was surprised, as he felt that any reasonably experienced commander should've been able to capture the fort. The Ming leader was, in fact, an experienced commander, but like other contemporary Chinese officers, he was unfamiliar with European-style forts, which also confounded Koxinga at Zeelandia.

Keelung was a lucrative possession for the Dutch East India Company, with 26% of the company's profits coming from their Taiwan operations in 1664. The Dutch held out at Keelung until 1668, when aborigine resistance (likely incited by Zheng Jing), and the lack of progress in retaking any other parts of the island persuaded the colonial authorities to abandon this final stronghold and withdraw from Taiwan altogether.

In 1672, the fleet of Koxinga's son, Zheng Jing, defeated the Dutch again in naval combat, executing 34 Dutch sailors and drowning 8 Dutch sailors after looting, ambushing, and sinking the Dutch fluyt ship Cuylenburg in northeastern Taiwan. Twenty-one Dutch sailors escaped to Japan. The ship was heading from Nagasaki to Batavia on a trade mission.

Cultural influences

The battle was depicted in the movie The Sino-Dutch War 1661, which ended in Koxinga's victory over the Dutch.

Gallery

See also
Koxinga
Dutch East India Company
Kingdom of Tungning

References

Bibliography

External links

Koxinga - the Cheng Family History: The Hambroek affair
Koxinga - the Cheng Family History: The Hambroek affair

Dutch Formosa
Fort Zeelandia
Fort Zeelandia
Kingdom of Tungning
Invasions of Taiwan
Fort Zeelandia
1661 in Taiwan
1662 in Taiwan
Fort Zeelandia
Fort Zeelandia
1661 in Asia
1662 in Asia
17th century in Taiwan